San Martín Department may refer to:

In Argentina:
San Martín Department, Corrientes
San Martín Department, Mendoza
San Martín Department, San Juan
San Martín Department, Santiago del Estero
San Martín Department, Santa Fe
In Peru:
San Martín Department, Peru

Department name disambiguation pages